Sheep Mountain is a  mountain summit located on the shared boundary of Dolores County with San Miguel County, in southwest Colorado, United States. It is situated three miles south of Trout Lake and two miles southeast of Lizard Head Pass, on land managed by San Juan National Forest and Uncompahgre National Forest. Sheep Mountain is part of the San Juan Mountains which are a subset of the Rocky Mountains, and is west of the Continental Divide. Neighbors include Golden Horn and Vermilion Peak to the east, and Lizard Head to the northwest. Sheep Mountain can be seen from the San Juan Skyway in the Lizard Head Pass and Trout Lake areas. The mountain's name, which has been officially adopted by the United States Board on Geographic Names, was in use in 1906 when Henry Gannett published it in A Gazetteer of Colorado.

Climate 
According to the Köppen climate classification system, Sheep Mountain is located in an alpine subarctic climate zone with cold, snowy winters, and cool to warm summers. Due to its altitude, it receives precipitation all year, as snow in winter, and as thunderstorms in summer, with a dry period in late spring. Precipitation runoff from the mountain drains south into the nearby Dolores River, and north into tributaries of the San Miguel River.

Gallery

See also

References

External links 

 Weather forecast: National Weather Service
 Sheep Mountain NGS Data Sheet
 Sheep Mountain photo: Flickr

Mountains of San Miguel County, Colorado
Mountains of Dolores County, Colorado
San Juan Mountains (Colorado)
Mountains of Colorado
North American 4000 m summits
San Juan National Forest
Uncompahgre National Forest